William Fitz Donovan (April 13, 1873 – March 22, 1930) was an American football player and coach.  He served as the head football coach at Georgetown University in Washington, D.C. in 1898, compiling a record of 7–3.  Donovan played college football as a quarterback at Brown University.  He died on March 22, 1930, in San Francisco, California.

Head coaching record

References

External links
 

1873 births
1930 deaths
19th-century players of American football
American football quarterbacks
Brown Bears football players
Georgetown Hoyas football coaches